= Tour du Parc =

Skyscraper in Toulouse, France

- Interactive map of the Tour du Parc area

General information
- Location: 7–8 Place du Morvan, Toulouse, France
- Coordinates: 43.5802°N 1.4096°E
- Opened: 1968

Height
- Height: 219.82 ft (67.00 m)

Technical details
- Floor count: 21

Tour du Parc is a skyscraper in the Bagatelle district of Toulouse, France. It began construction and opened in 1968. With 21 stories completed so far, Tour du Parc stands 67m tall, making it the tallest building in the city after the Cité Roguet of the Patte d'Oie district (63m tall).
